El Cóndor Pasa can refer to:

 El cóndor pasa (zarzuela),  Peruvian musical play
 "El Cóndor Pasa" (song), musical piece from the zarzuela
 El Condor Pasa (horse), (1995-2002), Thoroughbred racehorse, named after the Peruvian musical play
 El Condor Pasa (If I Could), song by Simon and Garfunkel